Red Dragonflies  is a Singapore film directed by Liao Jiekai. It was released in Singapore cinemas on 5 May 2011.

The film won a special jury prize at the Jeonju International Film Festival in 2010.

Plot
Three Junior College students, Rachel, Tien and Jun begin exploring an abandoned railway track, and an accident happens. Three years later, Rachel and Tien cross paths again.

Reception
Boon Chan of The Straits Times gave the film 2.5 stars out of 5, stating, "The spirit of exploration is alive and well in Red Dragonflies but, unfortunately, this feature debut feels like it may have wandered off the tracks".

References

2011 films
Singaporean drama films
2010s English-language films